The following is a list of French artists nominated for MTV Europe Music Awards. List does not include MTV Europe Music Award for Best French Act, New Sounds of Europe or MTV Europe Music Award for Best European Act. Winners are in bold text.

MTV Europe Music Awards